The Arboreto Mediterraneo del Limbara (about 80 hectares) is an arboretum located within the Foresta Demaniale di Monte Limbara Sud, at Via Roma, 62, Sassari, Sardinia, Italy. The arboretum's mission is to collect and preserve species native to the Mediterranean region. It contains walking paths.

See also 
 List of botanical gardens in Italy

References 
 Itinerari - Le Foreste Demaniali del Monte Limbara
 BGCI entry
 Dr. Nicole Nöske, Die Biodiversität der Flechten auf Granit im Arboretum des Monte Limbara Sud auf Sardinien, Diplom-Arbeit, Department of Systematic Botany, Albrecht von Haller Institute of Plant Sciences, Georg August University Göttingen.
 Nöske, N., Zedda, L., Sipman, H., Gradstein, S.R. & Camarda, I. 2000: "The biodiversity of lichens on granite in the arboretum in the south of the Monte Limbara in Sardinia (Italy)", in The Fourth IAL Symposium, Progress and Problems in Lichenology at the turn of the Millennium, Barcelona, 3-8 September 2000.

Botanical gardens in Italy
Gardens in Sardinia